Jiuhuashan station, is a station on Line 4 of the Nanjing Metro. The station is located underneath the intersection of Beijing East Road and Jiuhuashan Road. Construction began in June 2012 and completed on January 18, 2017 alongside seventeen other stations as part of the first phase of Line 4. The start of construction was delayed by five months due to difficulty in relocating certain households whose land was required to construct the station.

The station is located just south of Xuanwu Lake and is near White Horse Park and Purple Mountain.

References

Railway stations in Jiangsu
Railway stations in China opened in 2017
Nanjing Metro stations